Birds described in 1858 include phainopepla, northwestern crow, red-necked crake, white-headed wood hoopoe, Wallace's fruit-dove, Arctic warbler
George Robert Gray  publishes A list of the birds, with descriptions of new species obtained by Mr. Alfred R. Wallace in the Aru and Ké Islands in the Proceedings of the Zoological Society of London.
Heinrich von Kittlitz publishes Denkwürdigkeiten einer Reise nach dem russischen Amerika, nach Mikronesien und durch Kamtschatka.
British Ornithologists' Union founded.
Coenraad Jacob Temminck dies. His post at Rijksmuseum van Natuurlijke Historie is awarded to Hermann Schlegel
Expeditions

1857–1860 SMS Novara Ornithology directed by  Johann Zelebor.

Ongoing events
John Gould The birds of Australia; Supplement 1851–69. 1 vol. 81 plates; Artists: J. Gould and H. C. Richter; Lithographer: H. C. Richter
John Gould The birds of Asia; 1850-83 7 vols. 530 plates, Artists: J. Gould, H. C. Richter, W. Hart and J. Wolf; Lithographers:H. C. Richter and W. Hart

References

Bird
Birding and ornithology by year